Salvia staminea is a herbaceous perennial shrub native to a wide area in Asia Minor that includes Turkey, Georgia, Armenia, and Iran, where it grows at elevations from  to . It is typically found growing in alpine meadows, screes, and cliffs, sometimes growing with scrub oak. Due to the wide variety of habitats in which it is found, there is a wide degree of variation in the species. It was first described in 1836 and has only slowly come into use in horticulture.

Notes

staminea
Flora of Asia
Flora of Armenia
Flora of Georgia (country)
Flora of Iran
Flora of Turkey
Plants described in 1836